Vertyachy is a rural locality (a khutor) and the administrative center of Vertyachinskoye Rural Settlement, Gorodishchensky District, Volgograd Oblast, Russia. The population was 1,317 as of 2010. There are 19 streets.

Geography 
Vertyachy is located in steppe, on the left bank of the Don, 59 km northwest of Gorodishche (the district's administrative centre) by road. Peskovatka is the nearest rural locality.

References 

Rural localities in Gorodishchensky District, Volgograd Oblast